Phobji Gewog (Dzongkha: ཕོབ་སྦྱིས་) is a gewog (village block) of Wangdue Phodrang District, Bhutan.
The Gewog is located in the east-central part of the Wangdue Phodrang Dzongkhag.

See also
Phobjikha Valley

References

Gewogs of Bhutan
Wangdue Phodrang District